Paid Vacations (Seafarers) Convention (Revised), 1949 (shelved) is  an International Labour Organization Convention.

It was established in 1949, with the preamble stating:
Having decided upon the adoption of certain proposals with regard to the partial revision of the Paid Vacations (Seafarers) Convention, 1946,...

Modification 
The concepts contained in this convention were revised and included in ILO Convention C146, Seafarers' Annual Leave with Pay Convention, 1976.

Ratifications
Prior to it being shelved, the convention had been ratified by five states.

External links 
Text.
Ratifications.

Shelved International Labour Organization conventions
Leave of absence
Treaties concluded in 1949
Treaties entered into force in 1967
Admiralty law treaties